Katinka Mann (June 28, 1925 – August 22, 2022) was an American artist and sculptor. Mann was born in New York City on June 28, 1925. Her work is included in the collections of the Whitney Museum of American Art, the Smithsonian American Art Museum and the Museum of Modern Art, New York. Mann died on August 22, 2022, at the age of 97.

References

External links
Official website

1925 births
2022 deaths
20th-century American artists
20th-century American women artists
21st-century American women
Artists from New York City